Dalhousie is a civil parish in Restigouche County, New Brunswick, Canada.

For governance purposes it is divided between the city of Campbellton, the town of Heron Bay, the village of Bois-Joli, and the Eel River 3 and Indian Ranch Indian reserves; the municipalities are all members of the Restigouche Regional Service Commission.

Prior to the 2023 governance reform, the parish also included parts of the town of Dalhousie, the villages of Atholville, Charlo and Eel River Crossing, and the local service districts of Dalhouse Junction, McLeods, Point La Nim, and the parish of Dalhousie, which had been reduced to scattered pieces by the creation and growth of other LSDs and municipalities. The reform merged Atholville with Campbellton, Eel River Crossing with Balmoral to form Bois-Joli, and Dalhouse with Charlo to form Heron Bay. Campbellton also annexed most of McLeods and the portion of the parish LSD west of Eel River Crossing; Bois-Joli took the remainder of McLeods and a part of the parish LSD on its northern boundary, using the railway as its new boundary; and Heron Bay annexed Dalhousie Junction, Point La Nim, and the remainder of the parish LSD.

Origin of name
The parish took its name from the settlement of Dalhousie, which served as shiretown of Restigouche County from its erection. The settlement was named in honour of the Earl of Dalhousie, Governor General of British North America.

History
Dalhousie was erected in 1840 from Addington Parish. Dalhousie comprised all of Restigouche Parish between lines due south from Eel River on the east and Walker Brook on the west.

In 1850 the eastern boundary was altered slightly to run due south from milepost forty-eight on the eastern side of Eel River Gully.

In 1896 the southern part of Dalhousie was erected as Balmoral Parish.

Boundaries
Dalhousie Parish is bounded:

 on the north by the Restigouche River and Chaleur Bay;
 on the east by Chaleur Bay and a line running true south from near the northern end of the Eel River Bar Seawall;
 on the south by a line beginning on Mountain Brook, then running westerly along the rear line of grants along Route 11 then New Brunswick Route 280 to the Route 275, then along Route 275 to the southeastern corner of a grant to William Searls, at a point about 500 metres south of Welsh Road, then along the southern line of the Searls grant and its prolongation to the eastern line of the Balmoral Settlement, then running northerly to the corner of the Balmoral Settlement, then running westerly along the northern line of the Settlement to a point about 900 metres westerly of the junction of Val-d'Amour Road with Route 275;
 on the west by a line running true north to the most eastern point of the western side of the mouth of Walkers Brook, which runs through Campbellton;
 including all islands in front of the parish.

Communities
Communities at least partly within the parish. bold indicates an incorporated municipality or Indian reserve

 Atholville
 Lac-des-Lys
 Campbellton
 Richardsville
 Charlo
 Dalhousie
 Darlington
 Dalhousie Junction
 Eel River 3
 Eel River Crossing
 Dundee
 Eel River Cove
 Shannonvale
 Upper Dundee
 Indian Ranch
 Maple Green
 McLeods
 McNeish
 Point La Nim
 Saint-Aubin (partly in Atholville)

Bodies of water
Bodies of water at least partly within the parish.

 Eel River
 Restigouche River
 East Bay
 Eel Bay
 West Bay
 Dalhousie Harbour
 Eel River Gully
 Caldwell Lake
 Doucet Lake
 Lily Lake
 Prichard Lake
 Smith Lake

Islands
Islands at least partly within the parish.
 Dalhousie Island
 Bonamy Rocks

Other notable places
Parks, historic sites, and other noteworthy places at least partly within the parish.
 Sugarloaf Provincial Park

Demographics
Parish population total does not include portions within municipalities or Indian reserves

Population

Language

Access Routes
Highways and numbered routes that run through the parish, including external routes that start or finish at the parish limits:

Highways

Principal Routes

Secondary Routes:

External Routes:
None

See also
List of parishes in New Brunswick

Notes

References

External links
 Village of Atholville
 City of Campbellton
 Village of Charlo
 Town of Dalhousie
 Village of Eel River Crossing

Parishes of Restigouche County, New Brunswick
Local service districts of Restigouche County, New Brunswick